Mile V. Pajić (Šabac, 1958) is a Serbian visual artist, cultural activist, and researcher, known as the author of monographs on cultural and ecclesiastical heritage. He is also publisher and administrator at several Serbian cultural institutions.

Among other things, he was awarded the Gold badge of the Cultural and Educational Association of Serbia in 2007. He lives and works in Belgrade.

Opus 
Artistic opus
Pajić's expression in drawing, painting, and especially water coloring for over thirty years is based on the Christian Balkan art tradition, French Impressionism and related experiences, as well as on the Russian traditional painting of the second half of the 19th century with its origin in the movement of Peredvizhniki (Wanderers). His work is represented in the monograph "Russian-Serbian Painting", published in Russia in 2014.

Cultural work
Pajić researches heritage of the Serbs in order to reaffirm aesthetics originated in the Middle Ages, permeating the spirit of Byzantine civilization. From the researched material, he conceived project "Treasury of Serbian Spirituality" /Riznica srpske duhovnosti/ in the mid-1990s, which presented the heritage through spiritual, cultural and state-building history. Based on this, he was one of the founders and the editor-in-chief of the eponymous NGO and publishing house.

He is also one of the founders of the Dositej Obradović Foundation in Belgrade, now legislatively listed as "The culture institution of the special significance for Republic of Serbia". He is also an official in foundation's policy bodies.

He is the vice-president for culture of the Society of friends of the Monastery of Sv. Nikolai Srpski at Soko Grad, near Ljubovija. Museum exhibit in the monastery, representing an overview of Serbian spiritual history, is based on Pajić's 260 paintings created for the edition of "The Treasury of Serbian Spirituality", hand-made maps and drawings.

Exhibitions (choice) 
Solo exhibitions
 Hilandar Monastery, Serbian Imperial Lavra /Sveti manastir Hilandar, srpska carska lavra/, St. Nikolaj Srpski, 2004; Šabac, 2005; Obrenovac, 2005; Ministry of Diaspora, Belgrade, 2005; Institute for the study of cultural development of Serbia, Belgrade, 2014.
 Shrines of the Serbian people /Svetinje srpskog naroda/, Belgrade international book fair, Belgrade, 2009.
 Watercolor Belgrade /Beograd u akvarelu/, Đura Jakšić House, Belgrade, 2016.
 Belgrade, An Utopian City /Beograd, utopijski grad/, Institute for the study of cultural development of Serbia, Belgrade, 2016.

Exhibitions with the "Ras Art" Group
 Gallery 73, Belgrade, 2012.
 Ikar Gallery at the Air Force cultural center, Zemun, 2013.
 Institute for the study of cultural development, Belgrade, 2013.
 Đura Jakšić House Gallery, Belgrade, 2013.
 Student cultural center, New Belgrade, Gallery 73, Belgrade, as part of the thematic exhibition "1700 Years of the Edict of Milan" within the Belgrade–Požarevac–Trstenik–Niš tour, 2013.

Book Illustrations 
 "Treasury of Serbian Spirituality" /Riznica srpske duhovnosti/ in six monographs, by Mile V. Pajić
 "The Road to Light" /Put u svetlost“/, a poem by Hadži Peter Solar

Completely authored monographs (texts and paintings) 
 Hilandar Monastery, Serbian Imperial Lavra /Sveti manastir Hilandar, srpska carska lavra/, Riznica srpske duhovnosti, Belgrade, 2005, 2009; editions in Serbian, Russian, English and German, Riznica srpske duhovnosti and Službeni glasnik, Belgrade, 2015. .
 The shrines of old Raška, Nemanjides endowment /Svetinje stare Raške, zadužbine Nemanjića/, Riznica srpske duhovnosti, Belgrade, 2009.
 The Shrines of Medieval Serbia, The Legacy of the Christian Orient /Svetinje srednjovekovne Srbije, nasleđe hrišćanskog Orijenta/, Riznica srpske duhovnosti, Belgrade, 2009.
 Shrines of Moravian Serbia, Treasuries of Nemanjides Legacies /Svetinje moravske Srbije, riznice zaveštanja Nemanjića/, Riznica srpske duhovnosti, Belgrade, 2009.
 Shrines of the Serbian people, monasteries at the intersection of East and West /Svetinje srpskog naroda, manastiri na razmeđu Istoka i Zapada/, Riznica srpske duhovnosti, Belgrade, 2009.
 Shrines of restored Serbia, Saint Savva's spirituality for the future of the Serbian people /Svetinje obnovljene Srbije, svetosavlje za budućnost srpskog naroda/, Riznica srpske duhovnosti, Belgrade, 2009.

Essays in Serbian 
 Slavic plein-air: one trip to the East, Belgorod art travelogue /Slavjanski plener: jedno putovanje na Istok,/ Rastko Project, 2018.
 From fresco to comic book /Od freske do stripa/, Kultura, scientific journal for the theory and sociology of culture and cultural policy , Belgrade, No. 165/2019. Within the international collection "Comics and Identity" /„Strip i identitet“/
 Gorostas /A giant/, an essay, Rastko Project, 2019.
 In memoriam: Zoran Mihajlović (1955-2019), Rastko Project, 2019.

References

External links 
 The Treasury of Serbian Spirituality: About the Association, Official Website of Riznica srpske kulture(Serbian)
 Dositej Obradović Foundation /Dositejeva zadužbina/, Belgrade
 Soul of the Cyrillic: Mile V. Pajić and Treasury of Serbian Spirituality (interview), Radio "Snaga naroda", Belgrade, December 1, 2016.  (Serbian)

1958 births
Artists from Šabac
Serbian painters
21st-century Serbian historians
Serbian art historians
Serbian publishers (people)
Living people